The 1884 United States presidential election in Louisiana took place on November 4, 1884. All contemporary 38 states were part of the 1884 United States presidential election. State voters chose eight electors to the Electoral College, which selected the president and vice president.

Louisiana voted for the Democratic nominee, Grover Cleveland, over the Republican nominee, James G. Blaine by a margin of 14.85%.

Results

See also
 United States presidential elections in Louisiana

References

Louisiana
1884
1884 Louisiana elections